R v Belnavis, [1997] 3 S.C.R. 341, is a leading Supreme Court of Canada decision on the right against unreasonable search and seizure under section 8 of the Canadian Charter of Rights and Freedoms. The Court held that there is no reasonable expectation of privacy in the backseat of a car.

Background
Three young women were stopped by police for stopped speeding. The police officer noticed bags in back which were found to contain new clothes with price tags still on them. More bags were found in the trunk. Two of the girls gave differing stories as to who owned which bag. They were all charged with possession of stolen property.

At trial, it was held that the search was unreasonable and violated section 8 of the Charter. The evidence was excluded under section 24(2) and the girls were acquitted. On appeal the acquittal was quashed and a new trial was ordered.

The question before the Supreme Court was whether the officer violated a reasonable expectation of privacy under section 8 by searching the back seat, and if so, whether the evidence should be excluded under section 24(2).

Reasons of the court
Justice Cory wrote for the majority.

On the first question, Cory found that there was no expectation to privacy as she did not own the vehicle, she did not have any control over it, nor did she ever in the past, as well she had no relationship with the driver. She did not control access to the vehicle, nor was there any subjective evidence that she had expected there to be privacy in the vehicle.

On the second issue, Cory found that the evidence should not be excluded under section 24(2). An objective observer would find that the officer had reasonable and probable ground to suspect that the bags contained stolen property. Likewise, the officer had reasonable subjective belief in his grounds.

The violation would not affect trial fairness, the breach was isolated and brief and so was not serious. Consequently, the breach would not tend to bring the administration of justice into disrepute.

Dissent
Justice La Forest wrote the dissent.

La Forest began by observing that a warrantless search is presumed to be unreasonable. La Forest looked to the American Fourth Amendment and noted that the constitutional right protected privacy, not property as was suggested by the majority. He warns of the dangers in allowing "open season" on vehicles.

See also
 List of Supreme Court of Canada cases (Lamer Court)

External links
 

Section Eight Charter case law
Canadian Charter of Rights and Freedoms case law
Supreme Court of Canada cases
1997 in Canadian case law